Bentel is a surname. Notable people with the surname include:

Carol Rusche Bentel, American architect
Dwight Bentel (1909–2012), American journalist and professor
George R. Bentel (1876–1952), American automobile dealer
Maria Bentel (1928–2000), American architect
Mary Pat Bentel, American film producer